Gary Wayne "Toby" Herald (born July 4, 1953) is an American politician and a Republican member of the Kentucky House of Representatives representing District 91 since January 8, 2013.

Elections
2012 To challenge District 91 incumbent Democratic Representative Ted Edmonds, Herald was unopposed for the May 22, 2012 Republican Primary and won the November 6, 2012 General election with 6,332 votes (50.5%) against Representative Edmonds.

References

External links
Official page at the Kentucky General Assembly

Gary Wayne Herald at Ballotpedia
Gary Wayne Herald at OpenSecrets

Place of birth missing (living people)
1953 births
Living people
Republican Party members of the Kentucky House of Representatives
People from Kentucky